The Trängslet Dam is a rock-filled embankment dam on the Dal River near the town of Trängslet in Dalarna, Sweden. At  in height, it is the tallest dam in the country. The dam was constructed between 1955 and 1960. Its hydroelectric power station has an installed capacity of 330 MW. It is owned by Fortum.

See also

List of power stations in Sweden

References

Dams in Sweden
Hydroelectric power stations in Sweden
Dams completed in 1960
Energy infrastructure completed in 1960
Rock-filled dams
Dalarna